Thomas Butiller was an English priest in the late 14th and early 15th centuries.

Butiller is first mentioned as Rector of Buriton in 1373, a post he held until 1382. The next year he became Archdeacon of Salisbury,  but exchanged the next year with William Potyn for the parish of Lyminge. That benefice was exchanged a year later for the Prebendal Stall of Sidlesham which he held until 1389.

He was Archdeacon of Northampton from 1386 to 1402.  He was a Canon (12th Stall) at Windsor from 1387 to 1389 and Dean from 1389 to 1402. One of his duties at Windsor was to supervise the swan-upping.  He was Prebendary of Leighton Buzzard at Lincoln Cathedral from 1389 to 1391; and of Colworth at Chichester Cathedral from 1389 to 1402. He was put forward for a Canonry at Canterbury, but was not admitted.  His last appointment was at Brightling.

References

15th-century English people
14th-century English people
Archdeacons of Salisbury
Archdeacons of Northampton
Deans of Windsor
People from Sidlesham
People from Buriton